Elena Manferdini (born 12 September 1974) is an Italian architect based in Venice, California, where she is the principal and owner of Atelier Manferdini. She is the Graduate Programs Chair at the Southern California Institute of Architecture (SCI-Arc). She has over fifteen years of professional experience that span across architecture, art, design, and education.

Career
Manferdini was raised in Bologna, Italy, where she graduated from the University of Civil Engineering in 1999 and later received her Master of Architecture and Urban Design from the University of California, Los Angeles in 2000. Manferdini has been teaching at SCI-Arc since 2003, serving most recently as Coordinator of Graduate Thesis before taking on the role of Graduate Programs Chair. Manferdini has been acknowledged with prestigious appointments such as the Howard Friedman Visiting Professor of Practice at the University of California Berkeley (UCB) and various Visiting Professor Positions at Cornell University, the University of Pennsylvania and Seika University. Manferdini founded her Los Angeles based firm, Atelier Manferdini, in 2004. The office has gone on to completing projects in the US, Europe and Asia.

She joined the faculty of the Southern California Institute of Architecture in 2003, where she is now the Graduate Program Chair. In 2019 Manferdini was honored with the ICON Award as part of the LA Design Festival, which is a prize that recognizes iconic women who have made an indelible mark on Los Angeles, culture, and society in general through their work, character, and creative leadership.

Selected works
2016
 INK ON MIRROR: This exhibition have 8 architectural models and 22 drawings designed by Atelier Manferdini.  The exhibit is open to public from Saturday, 17 September 2016 at Chinatown Gallery, Los Angeles, California.
 BUILDING PORTRAIT: permanent art work installation for the Hermitage facade commissioned by The Allen Morris Company
 "SHARING MODELS: MANHATTNISMS” group show curated by Eva Franch i Gilabert at Storefront (New York, 2016)

2015
 INVERTED LANDSCAPES: two permanent art work installation for the Zev Yaroslavsky San Fernando Valley Family Support Center
 ART FINS: facade shading panels for Alexander Montessori School in Miami
 HIDDEN GARDENS: facade for La Peer Ave Hotel in Los Angeles
 AT HUMAN SCALE: site specific installation for BMW Korea campaign, full scale exhibition at the Design Art Work fair
 COLOR BY NUMBERS: facade for a multifamily condominium in Los Angeles
 LOO WITH A VIEW: female and male restroom with ceiling artwork for the Longmont Museum in Colorado
 BUILDING THE PICTURE: solo show curated by Zoe Ryan, large scale printed installation and video projections exhibited at the Art Institute of Chicago (Chicago, 2015)

2014
 "The future is not what it used to be” group show curated by Zoe Ryan, large scale printed installation and video projections exhibited at the 2nd Istanbul Design Biennial (Istanbul, 2014)

2013
 NEMBI: a permanent art work installation at the Hubert Humphrey Comprehensive Health Centre 
 “A New Sculpturalism: Contemporary Architecture from Southern California” group show curated by Christopher Mount, design of a full scale indoor pavilion “Tempera” for the Museum of Contemporary Art (Los Angeles, 2013) 

2012
 “Lost in Lace; transparent boundaries” group show curated by Lesley Millar, site specific installation “Inverted Crystal Cathedral” sponsored by Swarovski at the Birmingham     Museum and Art Gallery (Birmingham, 2012).

2011: 
 KEYHAN (Lake Biwa, Japan) 3 stories boat interior and exterior renovation
 SEPHORA (New York, USA) interactive installation for the temporary museum of scent, in collaboration with 4D4
 MOROSO (Udine, Italy) “Filigrana” ottoman design
 Various architectural models and design objects exhibited at the Italian Institute of Culture in Los Angeles as part of the Art Venice Biennale (Los Angeles, 2011).
 Alessi (Crusinallo di Omegna, Italy) “Blossom” Stainless Steel fruit basket

2010-2006
 DRIADE (Piacenza, Italy) “Tracery” cast aluminum outdoor table design (2010)
 “Austrian Pavilion” group show curated by Eric Owen Moss, various architectural designs exhibited at the 12th International Architecture Biennale "People meet in architecture" (Venice, 2010)
 “Works in Progress” solo show at the Italian Institute of Culture (Los Angeles, 2008).
 “Skin and Bones” group exhibition curated by Brooke Hodge, various clothing designs at Museum of Contemporary Art (Los Angeles, 2007)
 2006:“Emerging talents, emerging technologies” group show curated by Neil Leach and Weiguo Xu; US West Coast Pavilion design at the Beijing Architecture Biennale (Beijing, 2006).

Awards
In 2011, Elena Manferdini was one of the recipients of the prestigious annual grants from the United States Artists (USA) in the category of architecture and design. Manferdini was awarded the 2013 COLA Fellowship given by City of Los Angeles Department of Cultural Affairs to support the production of original artwork. That same year, she received a Graham Award for architecture, the 2013 ACADIA Innovative Research Award of Excellence, and was selected as recipient for the Educator of the Year presidential award given by the AIA Los Angeles.

Exhibitions
 Elena Manferdini was featured in the exhibition "Building Portraits" at the Industry Gallery in Los Angeles, California in 2016.
 An installation entitled Merletti was exhibited at the Southern California Institute of Architecture (SCI_Arc) Gallery in Los Angeles, California in 2008.
 "Entropy: The Art in Architects" at the Koplin Del Rio Gallery in Los Angeles, February 2007.

References

External links 

Southern California Institute of Architecture faculty
American women architects
Date of birth missing (living people)
Living people
Educators from Greater Los Angeles
UCLA School of the Arts and Architecture alumni
20th-century Italian architects
21st-century American architects
21st-century American women artists
1974 births
American women academics